Gamaliel Clifton  or Clyfton (died 1541) was a Canon of Windsor from 1522 to 1541 and Dean of Hereford from 1530 to 1541.

He was appointed:
Prebendary of York Minster, 1500–1541
Prebendary of Hereford Cathedral, 1528
Dean of Hereford, 1530

He was appointed to the twelfth stall in St George's Chapel, Windsor Castle in 1522, and held the stall until 1541.

Clifton received a papal dispensation for homicide in 1513.

Notes 

1541 deaths
Canons of Windsor
Deans of Hereford
Year of birth missing
English murderers